The Belles of St Trinian's is a 1954 British comedy film, directed by Frank Launder, co-written by Launder and Sidney Gilliat, and starring Alastair Sim, Joyce Grenfell, George Cole, Hermione Baddeley. Inspired by British cartoonist Ronald Searle's St Trinian's School comic strips, the film focuses on the lives of the students and teachers of the fictional school, dealing with attempts to shut them down while their headmistress faces issues with financial troubles, which culminates in the students thwarting a scheme involving a racehorse.

The film was among some of the most popular British films to be released in 1954, with critics praising the comedy and several of the cast members for their performances, including Sim's dual role as the headmistress Miss Millicent Fritton and her twin brother Clarence Fritton. The film was the first to be produced in the St. Trinian's film series – three sequels were later produced and released after this film: Blue Murder at St Trinian's in 1957; The Pure Hell of St Trinian's in 1960; and The Great St Trinian's Train Robbery in 1966.

Plot
The Sultan of Makyad enrols his daughter Fatima at St. Trinian's - a girl's school in England, run by its headmistress Millicent Fritton. Upon her arrival, she discovers that Millicent runs the school to prepare her students to succeed in a merciless world by having her students fight against authoritative figures in both the police and the government. Many of the girls are unruly and have criminal relations; as a result, the school's curriculum focuses mainly on lessons in crime and illicit schemes, all while the students thwart efforts by the local police and the Ministry of Education (a fictional British government department) to shut down the school. Millicent, however, faces problems as St. Trinian's is on the verge of bankruptcy, and seeks any means to clear the school's debt.

Millicent's twin brother, bookmaker Clarence Fritton, visits the school to check in on his sister and learns about Fatima's enrolment. Knowing that her father owns a racehorse due to take part in a major horse racing event, Clarence decides to enrol his daughter Arabella at the school, with instructions to befriend Fatima and subtlety extract information from her about the horse. At the same time, local police superintendent Kemp Bird assigns female police sergeant Ruby Gates, whom he is in a relationship with, to infiltrate the school undercover as a games mistress, while the Ministry assigns Manton Bassett to send in a new inspector to St. Trinian's after two others disappeared - unaware that they now work at the school.

Clarence soon learns from Arabella that the Sultan's racehorse is likely to win the race. Arabella suggests to her father that 'her gang' can incapacitate the stable guy and abduct the Sultan's racehorse, hiding it until the race is over. At the same time, several girls report on the horse's performance to Millicent, who is convinced to place a sizeable wager on it via the local spiv, 'Flash' Harry. When Fatima discovers Arabella leading a contingent of renegade sixth form girls to kidnap the horse, she leads a group of her fourth form classmates to recover the animal and smuggle back it to the racecourse before the race begins. As the police and Ministry are left embarrassed in their failing to prevent trouble, the girls ensure the racehorse wins. As Millicent is berated by the girl's parents over the way she has run the school, Harry arrives with news of the win which has netted the school the money it needed to stay open, much to her relief.

Cast 

Ronald Searle appeared in a cameo role as a visiting parent. Roger Delgado plays the Sultan's aide. It was also the first film appearance of Barbara Windsor, then a teenager.

Production
The film was based on the cartoons of Ronald Searle. He started doing sketches at the beginning of the war and continued to do them as a POW in Singapore. After the war they became very successful. By the time the film was made Searle had become tired of them.

Filming
Filming took place in April–May 1954. The opening scenes of the girls returning to school were filmed at what is now the All Nations Christian College near Ware, Hertfordshire. This includes the entrance gate of Holycross Road and the outside shots of the school. The bulk of the film was shot at Shepperton Studios near London. The film's sets were designed by the art director Joseph Bato.

Music
The music for the film was written by the English composer Malcolm Arnold. The music was arranged as a concert suite for orchestra with piano four hands by Christopher Palmer. The suite was performed at the BBC Proms in 2003 and 2021.

Reception

Box Office
The film was the third most popular movie at the British box office in 1954, after Doctor in the House and Trouble in Store.

Critical
The New York Times wrote, "Credit Alastair Sim with doing excellently by the dual roles he essays...Joyce Grenfell makes a properly gangling, awkward and gullible lady sleuth; George Cole does a few delightful turns as the conniving Cockney go-between and last, but not least, the 'Belles of St. Trinian's' rate a vote of confidence for the whacky freedom of expression they exhibit. They all help make St. Trinian's a wonderfully improbable and often funny place to visit."

Censorship
The film was banned for children under 16 in South Africa.

See also 
 BFI Top 100 British films

Notes

References

External links
 
 
The Belles of St Trinians at BFI Screenonline
The Belles of St Trinian's at BFI
The Belles of St Trinians at Letterbox DVD
 

1954 comedy films
1954 films
British black-and-white films
Films directed by Frank Launder
Films scored by Malcolm Arnold
Films set in schools
Films with screenplays by Frank Launder and Sidney Gilliat
St Trinian's films
British comedy films
Field hockey films
British Lion Films films
Films shot at Shepperton Studios
1950s English-language films
1950s British films